Tatiane "Tati" Bernardi Teixeira Pinto (born April 29, 1979) is a Brazilian short story writer, novelist, chronicler, screenwriter and journalist. Her works are particularly directed towards young women.

Biography
Bernardi was born in São Paulo on April 29, 1979, and is of Italian descent. She graduated in Advertising at the Mackenzie Presbyterian University and, after working on numerous advertising agencies, she became an in-house screenwriter for Rede Globo. She has written for telenovelas such as Sangue Bom and A Vida da Gente, talk shows such as Amor e Sexo, and sitcoms such as Aline (based on Adão Iturrusgarai's eponymous comic strip), Dicas de um Sedutor and Meu Passado Me Condena; the latter has been broadcast by Multishow from 2012 to 2015. In 2011 she wrote her first screenplay to a full-length film, Qualquer Gato Vira-Lata. In 2013 she wrote the screenplay for a commercially successful film adaptation of Meu Passado Me Condena, in which actors Fábio Porchat and Miá Mello reprised their roles. A sequel, also written by Bernardi, premiered in 2015, and in the same year she wrote a novelization of both films.

In 2006 Bernardi published her first short story book, A Mulher que Não Prestava, which was followed by Tô com Vontade de uma Coisa que Eu Não Sei o que É in 2008. In the same year she also wrote A Menina da Árvore, geared towards preteen girls. In 2010 she wrote her first novel for young adults, A Menina que Pensava Demais. In an interview to Trip magazine dating from 2011, she stated that she was working on an independent, crowdfunded collaborative book entitled A Vaca, which was eventually released in the following year in limited run, with illustrations by Nando Rodriguez. In 2016 she published the anthology of autobiographical crônicas Depois a Louca Sou Eu, adapted into an eponymous movie by Júlia Rezende, starring Débora Falabella, which premiered on February 25, 2021.

Bernardi has also written for magazines such as Viagem e Turismo, Trip and VIP, and since 2013 has a weekly column published every Friday in the newspaper Folha de S.Paulo. On June 28, 2018, she published a compilation of some of her best crônicas written for the Folha de S.Paulo, entitled Homem-Objeto e Outras Coisas Sobre Ser Mulher.

On May 9, 2020, she published the novel Você Nunca Mais Vai Ficar Sozinha.

On March 8, 2017, Bernardi won the Diploma Bertha Lutz prize, awarded by the Brazilian Federal Senate.

Bibliography

References

External links
 
 

1979 births
Living people
Brazilian women short story writers
Brazilian women novelists
Chick lit writers
Brazilian journalists
Brazilian screenwriters
21st-century Brazilian novelists
21st-century Brazilian women writers
Brazilian people of Italian descent
Writers from São Paulo
21st-century Brazilian short story writers
Mackenzie Presbyterian University alumni
21st-century screenwriters
Brazilian women screenwriters